Maiestas horvathi is a species of bugs from Cicadellidae family that can be found in European countries such as Austria, Bulgaria, Czech Republic, Germany, Hungary, Italy, Romania, Russia, Ukraine, Slovenia, Switzerland, and former Yugoslavia. The species are also native to Turkey. It was formerly placed within Recilia, but a 2009 revision moved it to Maiestas.

References

Insects described in 1896
Hemiptera of Asia
Hemiptera of Europe
Maiestas